The University of Guelph is a comprehensive public research university in Guelph, Ontario, Canada. It was established in 1964 after the amalgamation of Ontario Agricultural College (1874), the MacDonald Institute (1903), and the Ontario Veterinary College (1922), and has since grown to an institution of almost 30,000 students (including those at the Humber campus, Ridgetown campus, off-campus degree enrolments, diploma enrolments and part-time students) and employs 830 full-time faculty (academic staff) as of fall 2019. It offers 94 undergraduate degrees, 48 graduate programs, and 6 associate degrees in many different disciplines.

The veterinary medicine program at the University of Guelph was ranked No. 1 in Canada and No. 5 in the world in 2021. The University of Guelph is ranked No. 4 in Canada in Maclean's "University Rankings 2021" in the Comprehensive category, No. 1 in student satisfaction and No. 1 in research dollars. The university conducts a significant degree of research and offers a wide range of undergraduate, graduate and professional degrees. It is given top marks for student satisfaction among medium-sized universities in Canada by The Globe and Mail. The Ontario Agricultural College is ranked No. 1 in Canada for Agricultural Science, and helps put the University of Guelph 18th in the world for Food Science and Technology. It has held these rankings with its reputation, innovative research-intensive programs, and lively campus life cited as particular strengths. According to the Journal of Hospitality & Tourism Research, the university's Hospitality and Tourism Management program has Canada's highest research index. The University of Guelph has also been ranked 50th by Times Higher Education in its list of the top 100 universities under 50 years old. The university has a key focus on life science and has ranked 76–100 in the world by ARWU.

The faculty at the University of Guelph hold 23 Canada Research Chair positions in the research areas of natural sciences, engineering, health sciences and social sciences. Academic achievements include the first scientific validation of water on Mars, Alpha Particle X-ray Spectrometer (APXS) on board the Curiosity rover, and the Barcode of Life project for species identification.

History
The University of Guelph traces its origins back to when the Ontario government bought  of farmland from Frederick William Stone and opened the Ontario School of Agriculture on May 1, 1874, which was renamed the Ontario Agricultural College (OAC) in 1880. The Experimental Farm has been part of the original project along with the museum of agriculture and horticulture. Its first building was Moreton Lodge, located where Johnston Hall now stands, which included classrooms, residences, a library, and a dining room.  In 1874, the school started an apiculture department, teaching students about bees and beekeeping, in a dedicated building. In more recent years, the program has continued at the Honey Bee Research Centre located in the Arboretum, continuing research on honeybee health, providing apiculture and beekeeping courses and offering "many other educational experiences" including informative videos for beekeepers.

 

The Macdonald Institute was established in 1903 to house women's home economics programs, nature studies, and some domestic art and science. It was named after its financier, Sir William Macdonald, who worked to promote domestic sciences in rural Canada, and founded Macdonald College and McGill University College. The Ontario Veterinary College (OVC), founded in Mimico in 1862, was moved to Guelph in 1922. Famous economist John Kenneth Galbraith was an undergraduate at the college (graduating in 1931). In 1919 the Ontario Agricultural College aimed at recruiting "farm boys" with a low cost, two-year program ($20.00 per year) and "the lowest possible rate" for room and board.

The Ontario Legislature amalgamated the three colleges into the single body of the University of Guelph on May 8, 1964. The University of Guelph Act also brought about the Board of Governors to oversee administrative operations and financial management, and the Senate to address academic concerns. The non-denominational graduate and undergraduate institution was, and remains known especially for the agricultural and veterinary programs that shaped it.

Wellington College was established shortly after the University of Guelph Act, and five years later, was split three ways into the College of Arts (COA), which exists in the present day, the College of Physical Science and the College of Social Science. The Macdonald Institute would also be renamed the College of Family and Consumer Studies during the split. After this split, the University of Guelph started reorganizing into its present-day form, starting from the establishment of the College of Biological Sciences (CBS) in 1971. The College of Physical Science would be married to the OAC's School of Engineering in 1989, creating the College of Engineering and Physical Sciences (CEPS). The College of Social Science and the College of Family and Consumer Studies were joined to create the College of Social and Applied Human Sciences (CSAHS) in 1998. Finally, the College of Management and Economics (CME) would be established from the segregation of offered business, management and economic degrees and courses in 2006.

The university is named after the city. Guelph comes from the Italian Guelfo and the Bavarian-Germanic Welf also known as Guelf. It is a reference to the reigning British monarch at the time Guelph was founded, King George IV, whose family was from the House of Hanover, a younger branch of the House of Welf was sometimes spelled as Gwelf.

Campuses

Main campus

The main university campus spans , including the  University of Guelph Arboretum and a  research park.

Earliest examples of the campus' architecture date back to the inception of the Ontario Agricultural College and include the President's house and Raithby House, which were constructed with local limestone. The campus also has a number of notable midcentury modernist buildings, mostly in the Brutalist style, which were constructed in the 1960s as part of the school's expansion plan. Complexes such as the MacKinnon arts building and the McLaughlin library, overseen by architect Josep Lluis Sert, serve as major meeting places. The campus is well-populated with trees which line the main walkways, many of which are paved with red clay brick. The campus includes an arboretum.

Campus safety is provided by the University of Guelph Campus Community Police, First Response Team and Fire Safety officers.

Ontario Agricultural College (OAC) campuses
The Ontario Agricultural College had a network of campuses and research stations throughout Ontario which were operated by the Ministry of Agriculture, Food, and Rural Affairs. At one time, courses were offered in English in Guelph, Kemptville and Ridgetown, and in French at Campus d'Alfred near Ottawa. From 1889 to 1961, this college published the OAC Review, a magazine published by and for students, with topics on everything from political and social events to photographs from around campus.

In 2014, the University of Guelph announced that academic programmes at the Alfred and Kemptville campuses would close after the existing students completed their studies. In early 2017, the University of Guelph web site clearly indicated that this institution was no longer offering programs at either location.

It does not offer degree programs in this location. Instead, the focus is on technology transfer, with two and three year diploma programs. Specialties are agriculture, veterinary technology, environmental management and horticulture. This location also offers one-year certificate programs in performance horse handling and veterinary office administration. There is also an apprenticeship program for Dairy Herdsperson (new for 2017).

University of Guelph-Humber

The University of Guelph-Humber is a satellite campus created by a partnership in 2002 between the University of Guelph and Humber College. Located on Humber's North Campus in Toronto, it offers seven four-year academic programs that grant an honours degree from the University of Guelph and a college diploma from Humber College.

In the fall of 2015, there were 4,174 full-time and 503 part-time undergraduate degree students enrolled at the Guelph-Humber campus.

Academics

Profile and programs

The University of Guelph offers more than 80 degree programs, more than 100 graduate and post-doctoral study programs, and over 60 open learning/distance education opportunities.

Faculties

The University of Guelph consists of seven faculties (or colleges, as they are known at Guelph):
College of Arts
College of Biological Science
Gordon S. Lang School of Business and Economics 
College of Engineering and Physical Sciences
College of Social & Applied Human Sciences
Ontario Agricultural College
Ontario Veterinary College

Other areas of academic specialization include the:
School of Computer Science
School of Engineering
School of English and Theatre Studies
School of Environmental Design and Rural Development
School of Environmental Sciences
School of Fine Art and Music
School of Languages and Literatures
School of Hospitality and Tourism Management
Open Learning and Educational Support
University of Guelph-Humber

The University of Guelph, along with University of Waterloo and Wilfrid Laurier University is a member of the Tri-University History group, which combines the history departments of the three universities at the graduate level. Graduate students are registered at one of the three universities according to their supervisor, but can take courses at any of the campuses. The University of Guelph specializes in Scottish History, as well as local and rural history.

Joint graduate programs
Guelph-Waterloo Center for Graduate Work in Chemistry and Biochemistry (GWC2) is one of Canada's largest and most successful graduate schools.
Guelph-Waterloo Physics Institute (GWPI) is a joint graduate program offered by the Departments of Physics at the University of Waterloo and Guelph.
Guelph-McMaster Collaborative MA Program in Public Policy and Administration
Tri-University Graduate History Program (Waterloo, Laurier, Guelph)
Crossways in Cultural Narratives, Erasmus-Mundus MA (Collaborative Graduate program selected for funding by the EU and taught at the University of Guelph, Université de Perpignan via Domitia, St. Andrews University, The University of Sheffield, The University of Bergamo, The University of Santiago de Compostela, Nova Lisboa University, Adam Mickiewicz University in Poznan, the University of Tübingen)

Facilities and plans

Several buildings constructed during the establishment of the OAC, including President's Residence, Raithby House, and Day Hall, are still part of the main campus. From the turn of the century to the movement of the OVC, many more buildings were added to the campus: MacDonald Hall (1903), Massey Hall (1901), the Bullring (1901), Mills Hall (1921), and Food Science.

The War Memorial Hall was erected in 1924 of stone-cut limestone by the Ontario Agriculture College; The landmark building was designed by architect Harry Reginald Coales as a lecture hall or theatre to honour students who had enlisted and died in the First World War. Two bronze tablets in the Memorial Chapel remember the alumni who died in the First World War and in the Second World War. Johnston Hall, a signature symbol of the university, was built in 1931, taking the place of the torn-down Moreton Lodge (c. 1874) and becoming the home for the OAC Administration. The Johnston Clock tower overlooks Winegard Walk and is visible from much of the campus. The building also overlooks Johnston Green, a popular location for recreational sporting activities and outdoor concerts.

Rozanski Hall (2003) is in the heart of the campus. Equipped with electronic white boards, laptop sound, picture and wireless internet and high luminance video/data projectors, Rozanski Hall accommodates over 1,500 students in several lecture halls.

The Science Complex opened for the 2007/2008 academic year. It is the largest integrated science teaching and research facility in North America. This facility houses 150 faculty and 4500 students, and centralizes physical, biological and computational sciences. A new and improved building consisted of Pathobiology and Animal Health Laboratory was opened in 2010. Its goal is to strengthen Canada's ability to prevent diseases and solve health issues at the human/animal interface. Supporting the growing role of veterinarians in research and educational initiatives related to public health, this four-storey building includes a lecture theatre, seminar rooms, a teaching lab, and research and laboratory facilities.

The Biodiversity Institute of Ontario is the world's first centre for high-volume DNA barcoding–the rapid identification of millions of species. It is anticipated faculty will enter over 500,000 barcode analyses per year. The university's School of Engineering had an approximately $50 million expansion between 2009 and 2011 in the form of new construction and renovations. This is in response to new mechanical, biomedical and computer engineering programs, increased enrolment in undergraduate and graduate programs and expanded research in sustainability-related areas. Alexander Hall is an environmental teaching and research centre. The Animal Cancer Centre is Canada's first institute for comparative cancer investigation. It includes a linear accelerator offering animal radiation treatment available.

Originally built in the 1940s and expanded in the 1950s, the W.F. Mitchell Athletic Centre was upgraded and expanded to keep up with university and community's needs in the fall of 2016. After a student referendum in 2010, students choose to contribute $45 million to the innovation of the W.F Mitchell Athletic Centre. One of the major focuses on the new building was being able to accommodate the growth in Guelph's population since the 1950s. The new 170,000-square-foot Athletic Centre serves as an all purpose building, supporting students, athletes, and the public in a variety of new spaces such as a 22,000-square-foot fitness room, multiple gymnasiums, and a rock-climbing wall. 

On June 25, 1988, No. 4 Wireless School Association erected a bronze plaque as a war memorial the Royal Canadian Air Force No. 4 Wireless School, which was located on the campus (1941-1945); the plaque honours the memory of their comrades who died in the armed service of Canada during World War II.

Student residences
Most students reside on campus in co-ed residences, including in the East Residence (610 residents), East Townhouses (645), Johnston Hall (315), Lambton Hall (400), Lennox/Addington Hall (520), Maids Hall (50, also known as Artz Haüs), Mills Hall (160), Watson Hall (67, female only), West Residences (110 students living among the Family Housing community), and South Residence (1,800 residents evenly distributed across Mountain, Prairie and Maritime Halls).

Also on campus are the East Village Townhouses that were opened during the fall of 2001. The townhouses consist of 164 four-, five- and six-bedroom self-contained units. These primarily house upper-year students and international students.

West Residences, consisting of the 78 College Avenue and 252 Stone Road (also referred to as Wellington Woods) locations, is home to 110 upper-year students. These students live among the Family Housing residents in either two bedroom townhouses, or one to two bedroom apartments (only available at the College Avenue location). West Residences promote diverse programs and includes many opportunities for community involvement.

South Residence, the largest residence on campus, is home to 1800 students and over 50 Residence Life staff members. It is split into three self-contained halls with independent fire alarm grids. It was built in 1968 by Australian architect John Andrews, a Brutalist architect who has designed several Canadian university residences, as well as Toronto's iconic CN Tower.

With 14 different campus living environments, it has one of the largest university housing systems in Canada.

Library
The six-storey McLaughlin Library provides students with more than 400 computers in the library and access to books, periodicals, films, audiovisual and archival materials, government documents and maps. During the 2017/2018 school year, the Library received over 1.4 million visitors.

Students have access to millions of library resources through the automated library system that partners with 14 other academic libraries in Ontario. Guelph students, faculty and staff also have access to electronic resources from any location at any time.

Art gallery
The MacDonald Stewart Art Centre, which includes the University of Guelph collection is cosponsored by University of Guelph. The art centre is a public gallery and sculpture park which houses a collection of 4000 works, mainly Canadian c. 1700 to the present. The collection consists of mixed media, multimedia and installations, painting, photography, prints and drawings, sculpture, costumes, glass, metalwork, silverwork and goldwork, textiles and tapestries.

Athletics facilities

The 2016, the University of Guelph opened an over $60M new Athletic Centre. The centre includes: a 25,000 square foot fitness centre, a suspended running track, varsity basketball and volleyball courts, a climbing wall and numerous multi-purpose rooms for fitness and recreation activities. It also includes a 2,200 seat events centre, social spaces, concession areas, a merchandise store and new locker rooms.

Reputation

In 2018, the University of Guelph was ranked 16th among the top 50 research universities in Canada. In 2012, the Higher Education Strategy Associates ranked the university fifth nationally in social sciences and humanities. The University of Guelph has achieved a five-star rating from Quacquarelli Symonds (QS), publishers of the annual World University Rankings.

In 2020, the Ontario Veterinary College at the University of Guelph ranked No. 1 in Canada and No. 5 in the world according to the QS World University Ranking.

In the Canadian University Report by The Globe and Mail, Guelph was ranked in the top 3 in 15 of 19 categories among medium-sized universities. This included the top spot in course registration, academic counselling, student residences, information technology, campus atmosphere, environmental commitment and work-play balance.

According to a study in 2012 by The Impact Group, the University of Guelph was at that time Canada's most inventive university in terms of invention disclosures per full-time faculty member, and the number of inventions per million dollars of research funding.

Forbes ranked this university as number 61 on its list of Canada's Best Employers 2019. The magazine stated, "Guelph is considered one of Canada’s top universities for its rigorous academic offerings combined with experiential learning and research training".

Additionally, the University of Guelph's Sustainability MBA program was ranked as the best sustainability MBA in Canada and ninth in the world during  the 16th annual Better World MBA Rankings in 2018 by the Toronto-based Corporate Knights.

Ties with industry
Canadian Space Agency
The CSA supports current research and innovation for instruments used in space, primarily the APXS found on the Mars rovers and Mars Science laboratory. Other initiatives include development of air filters for crewed spacecraft and research on changes in skin sensitivity and balance experienced by astronauts in space.

RIM
The university holds a partnership with Research In Motion (RIM). Ground is being broken through the Center for Mobile Education and Research, the chair for Women in Science and Engineering and the financial and educational support RIM extends to the University of Guelph.

Huawei
The university receives research funding from Huawei but has not disclosed the details of the funding.

Career fair at Bingeman's Park
A collaborative effort between the University of Waterloo, the University of Guelph, Wilfrid Laurier University, and Conestoga College, the Partnerships for Employment Career Fair is the largest in the country.

OMAFRA - University of Guelph Partnership
The agreement between the University of Guelph and the Ontario Ministry of Agriculture, Food and Rural Affairs, attracts a critical mass of research expertise to the university and the city.

Emperor Investments - Alumni of the John F. Wood Centre for Business and Student Enterprise business incubator
The University of Guelph's John F. Wood Centre for Business and Student Enterprise business incubator provided funds, space, and mentorship to Emperor Investments which has developed a unique automated investment platform that focuses on personalized pure-equity investment portfolios for small investors.

Student life

Student government on campus is governed officially through the university's Student Organization Policy. This document, created in 2005, provides the basis for accrediting student groups on campus. The student groups listed as Primary Student Organizations under the policy are:

 The Central Student Association (CSA)
 The Graduate Students' Association (GSA)
 The College of Arts Student Union (CA-SU)
 The College of Biological Science Student Council (CBS-SC)
 The Gordon S. Lang School of Business and Economics Students' Association (Lang-SA)
 The College of Physical & Engineering Science Student Council (CPES-SC)
 The College of Social & Applied Human Sciences Student Alliance (CSAHS-SA)
 The Student Federation of the Ontario Agricultural College (SF-OAC)
 The Central Veterinary Students' Association (CVSA)
 Interhall Council (IHC)

Each of the above PSOs accredit and thus are held accountable for many of the various clubs and student groups on campus. The CSA accredits the most student groups, with approximately 70 accredited today. Generally CSA-accredited groups are special interest groups like CHAT (a multi-lingual group), the Jewish Students' Organization (JSO), or the Muslim Students' Association, catering to those who wish to begin new interest-specific clubs on campus. The College Governments (CA-SU, CBS-SC, CME-SA, CPES-SC, CSAHS-SA, SF-OAC and the CVSA) accredit academically focused groups while IHC accredits 14 groups (includes the temporary residence Brock House for the 2011/2012 year) as hall councils, one for each residence hall on campus.

Across campus, members of the Residence Student Government, known as Interhall Council, contribute to the programming in each hall. This group of 62 elected members works with students within their halls and are also responsible for facilitating a hall council for hall members to attend. During the 2011/2012 year, a council was stricken at the West Residence Family Housing units and the temporary Brock House residence, bringing the total number of councils to 14. Interhall Council also acts as a liaison between students and Student Housing Services, University Administration, and other on-campus organizations.

Organization
The governance of the University of Guelph is a bicameral system consisting of the Senate and the Board of Governors.

Athletics
The university is represented in the Ontario University Athletics and the Canadian Interuniversity Sport by the Guelph Gryphons. The school colors are red, black and yellow or gold. UofG's mascot is a Gryphon named Gryph. The university offers 15 varsity sports for men and 15 for women. OUA only sports include baseball (men), figure skating (men & women), golf, Nordic skiing, rowing, and rugby union (men). Currently 7 out of every 10 Guelph students participate in athletics, recreation or fitness programming.

Nationally, the OUA is one of the CIS conferences, along with Atlantic University Sport, Canada West Universities Athletic Association, and the Quebec Student Sports Federation. CIS sports which UG participates in include basketball, cross country running, field hockey (women), Canadian football (men), ice hockey, rugby union (women), soccer, swimming, track & field, volleyball and wrestling.

The Gryphon's men's football team won its only national championship in 1984. In 2008 the Gryphon's men's lacrosse team won the Baggataway Cup at the Canadian national field lacrosse champions with a 14–9 win over McGill University at Ron Joyce Stadium in Hamilton. The Gryphons are particularly well known for their exploits in athletics, having won the men's and women's cross-country titles consecutively six (2006–present) and seven (2007–present) times respectively. The Gryphons won the men's track & field title in 2010, and both the men's and women's titles in 2008. The field hockey team won the national title in 2011.

In 2020, the university track-and-field head coach David Scott-Thomas was given a lifetime ban by Athletics Canada for violating its code of conduct. The Globe and Mail reported that Scott-Thomas had an alleged sexual relationship with an underage student athlete dating back to 2002-2004 (of consenting age, but unlawful with a person in a position of trust or authority) and he was also accused by multiple students of having fostered a toxic sporting culture for many years. The university faced heavy criticism over its handling of the scandal when the reporting revealed that the administration had been aware of the allegations since 2006, but did little to address them and continued to employ the coach. It was reported that the university quietly ended its relationship with Scott-Thomas and assistant coach Guyson Kuruneri in December 2019 after The Globe and Mail presented the university with the allegations against both Scott-Thomas and the administration's handling of the 2006 and more recent complaints, and requested an interview with the school administrators. More than 200 faculty and staff wrote a letter to the university president demanding transparency and an independent review. In the letter, they categorized the content of The Globe and Mail report as "evidence of the worst kind of abuse of power" and indicated that "high-level administrators at the time may have participated in willfully ignoring and minimizing this abuse." In 2021, a group of alumni from the university track and field program wrote an open letter expressing concerns that "the systems that enabled the health and well-being of many athletes to be harmed by individuals in positions of power are still in place," and urging the university "to undertake an independent, comprehensive, and transparent investigation to determine how its existing policies failed to protect student-athletes from an abusive environment."

Campus traditions

Painting Old Jeremiah
Old Jeremiah is the name of an antique British naval gun that rests along Winegard Walk in Branion Plaza, at the heart of the University of Guelph campus. Rumoured to have seen battle during the War of 1812, Old Jeremiah was last fired in April 1913. After World War I, the gun's barrel was plugged and it was brought to campus by students as a sign of remembrance for those lost in battle. It is often referred to simply and affectionately as The Cannon. During the 1970s, Old Jeremiah was briefly relocated to Johnston Green and renamed the Big Johnston.

As a result of jovial rivalry between Engineering and Agricultural Science students ("Aggies"), the cannon has enjoyed plenty of movement around the Guelph campus in the past as a result of practical jokes between the two majors. Although it is nearly impossible to determine the cannon's previous locations, it is rumoured to have traveled all over campus, at one point even perching on top of MacNaughton (a prominent university building containing the bookstore), and at another even disappearing altogether and showing up a day later on the University of Western Ontario campus. Eventually, fed up with the movement of Old Jeremiah, university officials cemented the cannon in place where it sits today. However, as a final stab at humour, a group of students shifted the still-mobile direction of the cannon's face, and aimed it at the fourth floor of the University Center, home of the institution's senior administration. Old Jeremiah rests in this position today. Due it appearing at University of Western Ontario ("Western") this started a long rivalry between the 2 universities

Despite its movement, the cannon enjoyed relative tranquility until the 1950s when an aspiring entrepreneurial student came up with the idea of painting a message on the highly visible landmark. The act of "painting the cannon" has since become a campus tradition with students, residences, sports teams, clubs and others braving the early morning hours to paint messages on the cannon, most often about upcoming events but also including birthday announcements, wedding proposals and insults. The etiquette governing "painting the cannon" is unofficial but well understood: 1) do not begin painting the cannon until the sun has set, 2) be finished by the time the first students arrive for classes in the morning, and 3) avoid profanity or coarse language. It is a well-accepted practice to "guard" the cannon until sunrise so as to avoid another person or group painting over one's message.

In fall 2010, Master of Fine Arts student and art teacher Dawn Johnston began to strip Old Jeremiah of all the layers of paint it had accumulated since the 1950s as an art project. Calling it "[her] form of sculpture", Johnston completed the project over a week's time within a wooden enclosure to avoid the watchful eyes of passing students. Some students were upset about the removal, claiming Johnston was "taking away [their] history", although the project was done with the approval of university faculty. Upon completion, the enclosure was removed and the bare cannon was revealed; however, the tradition of painting Old Jeremiah has since resumed.

The Pep Rally
During the University of Guelph's orientation program, which takes place each year at the beginning of Orientation Week, all new students within each residence are taught a dance–often referred to as the Hall Boogie–which is performed to a variety of mixed popular songs. Awards are presented to the Halls which demonstrate the best spirit, creativity, synchronisation and co-ordination. Many of the dances are very impressive, despite being practised in typically an hour or less.

A University of Guelph dance move, Winding Your Toy, is almost always incorporated into each boogie, usually to a bass-heavy dance track. A winding motion is made with the rear hand–as if winding a wind-up toy–while the knees are bent in rhythm. The origins of "winding the toy" are not well known, yet it retains notoriety among students and friends of students at the university.

The Rally is the kick-off to the remainder of orientation activities. The University of Guelph must apply for a special noise permit for the event as the activity can often be heard for miles.

In 2004, "Student Power" was introduced as a low-key alternative event to the Pep Rally for anyone who may not be as inclined to participate in the highly energetic and boisterous Pep Rally.

During the renovation the location the Pep Rally is held (The School's football field) in 2012, an event named "Rally for Change" was held in place; in which hundreds of University of Guelph students went out into the local community and did street performances to raise money for Cancer research. The Pep Rally was held on a later date. This event has since also become a tradition with plans for it to also be incorporated in the orientation program in 2013.

College Royal
An annual feature of the university is its open house, known as College Royal. For a weekend each March, every part of the campus and its programs is exhibited to the public, from the barns of the Agricultural College to the sugar bush in the arboretum. It is highly popular with visitors of all ages, especially families with children who take advantage of the March break (the usual Ontario school break) to have an outing.

The 2006 College Royal was visited by Rick Mercer, taping a segment for his show, the Rick Mercer Report.

Student media
Newspapers and magazines
The Ontarion – since 1951 and publishes every Thursday
The Peak 
Hornblower: The HTM Magazine – since 1973, official publication of the School of Hospitality and Tourism Management
At Guelph – university's official newspaper
The Portico – magazine sent to alumni each semester to keep them in touch with the university
Osnap – monthly humour publication put out by the engineering society covering events

 Online
The Cannon is an online website co-founded by The Guelph Campus Co-operative and the CSA created for and funded by undergraduate students. Although it has a paid editor, all students are encouraged to submit news articles, announcements for upcoming events, opinion pieces, digital photographs and other content Guelph students may find interesting or useful. Founded in September 2002, the site has features such as Rate-a-Prof, where students share insight and opinions about professors, and a free classifieds section, available as a means of buying and selling used textbooks and course materials. The name of the site is a reference to Old Jeremiah, as the website parallels the use of the cannon as a campus-wide message board.

Radio
CFRU-FM is a community campus station serving the students and community of Guelph.

Notable alumni

See also 
 Canadian government scientific research organizations
 Canadian industrial research and development organizations
 Canadian Interuniversity Sport
 Canadian university scientific research organizations
 Higher education in Ontario
 List of Ontario Universities
 Muck Crops Research Station
 Ontario Student Assistance Program
 University of Guelph Arboretum

Further reading
 David R. Murray, Hatching the Cowbird's Egg: The Creation of the University of Guelph. Guelph: University of Guelph, 1989.
 Alexander M. Ross, The College on the Hill. A History of the Ontario Agricultural College. 1874–1974. Toronto, Copp Clark Publishing & O.A.C. Alumni Association.

References

External links

Official website

 
Educational institutions established in 1964
Buildings and structures in Guelph
Tourist attractions in Guelph
1964 establishments in Ontario
Universities in Ontario